The Dutch National Track Championships – Women's omnium is the Dutch national championship omnium event held annually at the Dutch National Track Championships. The event was first introduced in 1977. After 1989 the event wasn't held for 21 years. Because the omnium discipline was introduced at the 2012 Summer Olympics, the Dutch national omnium championship was recontinued in 2010.

Medalists

Results from cyclingarchives.com and cyclebase.nl.

Multiple champions
2 times champion: Mieke Havik

References

Dutch National track cycling championships
Women's omnium